Ballybrittas (IPA:[ˈbˠalʲəˈbʲɾʲɪt̪ˠaːʃ]) is a small village in the northeast of County Laois, Ireland situated on the R445 about 5 km SW of Monasterevin, County Kildare. Formerly on the N7 Dublin - Limerick road, the village is now bypassed by the M7 motorway.

Amenities
Businesses in the village include a pub, a service station, and a number of small businesses.

The local schools and churches are nearby in Rath and Killenard, while the local Gaelic Athletic Association club Courtwood is nearby.

Notable people
Fergal Byron (born 1974), Laois Gaelic footballer
Charlotte Dease (1873-1953), author
Edmund Dease (1829-1904), Irish politician
Robert Johnson (1745-1833) Irish  judge  and  pamphleteer 
Eddie Kinsella (born 1966), Gaelic football referee
James Lalor (1829-1922), Australian politician
Stephen Radcliffe (1904-1982), first-class cricketer and British Army officer

See also 
 List of towns and villages in Ireland

References

External links 

 Ballybrittas in Lewis's Topographical Dictionary of Ireland (1837)

Towns and villages in County Laois
Townlands of County Laois